The Mississippi MudCats were a team in the American Indoor Football Association.  They played their home games at BancorpSouth Arena in Tupelo, Mississippi.

History
The team was announced on June 20, 2006. One month later, Todd Ellis, former Georgia Tech football player, was announced as the team owner and president. A name-the team contest was held, and despite Ellis' preference of Tupelo Kings in honor of Tupelo-born Elvis Presley, the team was named the Mississippi MudCats for the state's catfish industry. Brian Brents was announced as the inaugural head coach.

In the 2007 season, the Mudcats averaged over 3,200 fans per game, more than any other team in the AIFA. At the end of the season, civil rights attorney Jim Waide bought the team from Todd Ellis.

The 2008 MudCats lost only one regular season game for best record in the AIFA for 2008 at 13–1. They won their division championship playoff game against the Columbus Lions before losing in the conference championship to the Wyoming Cavalry. In late 2008, owner Jim Waide has said he would not field a team in 2009 due to financial reasons and failed to find new owners.

Season-by-season records 

|-
|2007 || 11 || 3 || 0 || 2nd Southern Div. || Won Conf. Semifinal (Tallahassee) 62–32Lost Conf. Championship (Lakeland) 62–84
|-
|2008 || 13 || 1 || 0 || 1st South Div. || Won Div. Championship (Columbus) 52–50Lost Conf. Championship (Wyoming) 26–54
|-
! Totals || 26 || 6 || 0
|colspan="2"| (including playoffs)

2007 season schedule

External links
 Official Website
 MudCats' 2007 Stats
 MudCats' 2008 Stats

American Indoor Football Association teams
Sports in Tupelo, Mississippi
American football teams in Mississippi
American football teams established in 2006
American football teams disestablished in 2007
2006 establishments in Mississippi
2007 disestablishments in Mississippi